Britannic is a 2000 spy television film directed by Brian Trenchard-Smith. The film is a fictional account of the sinking of the ship of the same name off the Greek island of Kea in November 1916; it features a German agent sabotaging her while she is serving as a hospital ship for the British Army during World War I. It stars Edward Atterton and Amanda Ryan, with Jacqueline Bisset, Ben Daniels, John Rhys-Davies, and Bruce Payne as costars. It first premiered on cable network Fox Family and was then broadcast in the United Kingdom on Channel 4.

Trenchard-Smith says the film was the best of the three disaster movies he made around this time. It got him the job directing Megiddo: The Omega Code 2.

Plot
In Southampton in 1916, HMHS Britannic, a sister ship of the Titanic, has been refitted as a hospital ship for Allied soldiers fighting in the Gallipoli Campaign. Among the nurses who are to serve aboard her is Lady Lewis (Jacqueline Bisset), mother of Sarah and William, who is being delivered to Greece via Naples, where her husband has become Ambassador for Great Britain. Traveling with her is Vera Campbell (Amanda Ryan), an operative of British Intelligence posing as Sarah and William's governess. She is unnerved by the voyage, having survived the Titanic sinking four years before, losing her husband in it as well. She reports her mission to Captain Bartlett (John Rhys-Davies) who is dubious that a woman can do such a job.

A German spy has boarded the Britannic posing as her chaplain, Chaplain Reynolds (Edward Atterton), and soon discovers that she is secretly carrying a large amount of small arms and munitions bound for Cairo. Under the articles of war, Reynolds considers his actions against her to be legal and initiates a series of sabotage attempts to either take over or sink her; including inciting the Irish stokers—all of whom are members of the Irish Republican Brotherhood—to mutiny, as Reynolds takes a portable telegraph, sending his intel to the Germans.

One morning, a German U-boat, commanded by Captain Kruger (Wolf Kahler), trails Britannic. Townsend notices its periscope, reporting it to Captain Bartlett, who orders to change course to avoid the submarine, as he alerts HMS Victoria, their escort ship, and the passengers and crew, as Campbell, Lady Lewis and her children rush up on deck to prepare for an emergency. Kruger fires two torpedoes, one narrowly misses Britannic's bow, as another trails towards Britannic, as Townsend watches the torpedo trailing with his binoculars, he rushes to the bridge, Campbell anxiously watching, along with Reynolds. Kruger notices the Victoria and dives down. Victoria launches two depth charge barrels, one exploding near the submarine, causing minor damage, and another directly hitting the submarine, causing it to sink and crash into the seabed, as the other torpedo continues to approach Britannic, as Townsend retrieves a Lewis gun, and aims at the torpedo, detonating it away from the ship, as everyone cheers in relief.

Each sabotage attempt is foiled by Campbell with the eventual co-operation of the Britannic's crew. Unaware that she is responsible, Reynolds finds himself growing attracted to her whilst the voyage continues after making a stop at Naples, Italy. As they spend time together, they fall in love and she has sex with him before getting suspicious as he asks the medic about ether and what it does. The medic and Campbell realize his identity, as he shoots the medic and knocks out Campbell, as he grabs a bottle of ether and rushes to the engine room to assemble a bomb, as he runs to a boiler room in the bow, and opens a power circuit on the wall, supplying power to the watertight doors and slashes it with an axe he obtained, causing the watertight doors to remain open, as the crew notice the sudden loss of power to the watertight doors. Campbell wakes up, and rushes to the boiler room to confront him.

Reynolds reveals his true name as Ernst Tillbach, as he drops the bomb in a coal bunker, Campbell shooting him as a result. The bomb explodes as a result of hitting the side of the hull, rupturing a hole, which alerts the crew. Bartlett tells the operator to send distress calls as he tries to beach at Kea island seven miles away but the open portholes cause the beaching operation to be unfeasible, causing Bartlett to stop the ship, as Britannic begins to list to starboard. William, lost in the boiler room, tries to escape, as he is knocked unconscious by a steam burst. Lady Lewis discovers that William has disappeared and complains to Townsend, who forces her on a boat. Campbell goes on a search for William, as Ernst helps her and they manage to wake William, as he flees to a lifeboat with his mother and sister before it is lowered. Another massive explosion in the boiler room causes Ernst to be trapped by a falling metal bar in a flooding room. Campbell jumps in and helps him escape by using a metal rod as a lever and they make their way through the ship, swimming through flooded rooms, vents, as they are trapped in a flooding grate, as Campbell screams desperately, while Ernst breaks the grate open, as they swim through flooded corridors, eventually making it outside by swimming through a porthole and climbing aboard an empty lifeboat that was already lowered into the water, but still attached by its ropes to the davits.

Campbell and Ernst notice a lifeboat filled with 30 people getting pulled into the still spinning propellers. They watch in horror as the boat and its occupants are chopped to pieces by the propeller. A boat nearby, with Townsend aboard, throws them a rope, at their request. Ernst decides to sacrifice himself, despite Campbell's protests that they both can be pulled to safety, he throws her into the sea after kissing her, as she grabs the rope. Soon after, the lifeboat's ropes break and it begins to also get sucked into the propellers, Ernst staying aboard the lifeboat as it is chopped by the blades, killing him, as Townsend comforts a traumatised Campbell. A few moments later, the Britannic rapidly rolls over, causing her funnels and other objects on the decks such as chairs to tumble into the sea as she sinks to the bottom of the Kea Channel. HMS Victoria arrives to rescue the survivors. Reflecting on her experience, Campbell quotes the poem "Roll on, Thou Deep Dark Blue Ocean" from Childe Harold's Pilgrimage by Lord Byron.

Cast

References

External links
 
 
 Britannic at Yahoo! Movies

2000 films
2000 television films
2000s disaster films
2000s historical films
2000s mystery thriller films
2000s spy thriller films
American spy thriller films
American television films
British disaster films
British mystery thriller films
British spy thriller films
British thriller television films
Films about survivors of seafaring accidents or incidents
Films directed by Brian Trenchard-Smith
Films set in 1916
Films set in Naples
Films set in the 1910s
Films set in the Mediterranean Sea
Films set on ships
Historical mystery films
Seafaring films based on actual events
Spy films based on actual events
Spy television films
World War I spy films
World War I television films
2000s English-language films
2000s American films
2000s British films